The Yin-Yang Master: Dream of Eternity is a 2020 Chinese fantasy film directed by Guo Jingming, starring Mark Chao and Deng Lun. It is adapted from  Onmyōji written by Baku Yumemakura. It was filmed in year 2019 and was released in China on 25 December 2020. Streaming rights were purchased by Netflix before the film's theatrical release. The film was a box office success as it raked in a record of ¥452 million, 10 days after its official theatrical release.

Synopsis
Centuries ago, a malevolent serpent demon was born from the desires of man. Four masters gathered together to trap the snake within the Imperial City, sealed within the body of the Empress, protected by four stone guardians. Since then, whenever the serpent threatens to emerge, four masters have travelled to the Imperial City to awaken the four stone guardians. With the threat of the evil serpent rising once more, four masters come together in the Imperial City: Hongruo, Longye (Jessie Li), Boya (Deng Lun), and Qingming (Mark Chao).

Qingming and Boya immediately get off on the wrong foot over their opposing view of demons, but are soon forced to cooperate when Master Hongruo is killed in his sleep by a Hair Demon. The Empress orders Princess Changping (Olivia Wang) to investigate Hongruo's death, and instates the palace priest He Shouyue (Wang Duo) as Master Hongruo's replacement. Noticing that He Shouyue bears an uncanny resemblance to his late master, Zhongxing, Qingming confronts him and learns that Shouyue is a Spirit Guardian of Zhongxing, sent to protect the Empress. However, as a result of Zhongxing's death, Shouyue is also slowly dying.

After a failed assassination attempt on the Empress, discord grows. The masters suspect each other and investigate independently. Master Longye is eventually accused, but falls victim to the Hair Demon before she can disclose what she had discovered. With her dying breath, Longye attempts to communicate her discovery to Qingming, who interprets the message as an accusation against the Princess. Unwilling to believe the Princess is the criminal, Boya insists Shouyue must be the culprit. Qingming and Boya decide to confront the Princess and Shouyue separately. Meanwhile, the Princess angrily confronts Shouyue, with whom she is in league, for killing Masters Hongruo and Longye. Shouyue reasons that their deaths were justifiable and that in order to keep their plans a secret, Boya and Qingming must also die.

When Qingming confronts the Princess, she is attacked by the Hair Demon. Qingming hunts the Hair Demon down and learns from the Demon that she had been waiting to avenge her own death on the Princess for sixty years. Realizing that the Princess has not aged a day in the past sixty years, Qingming surmises that the Princess must actually be the real Empress and thus the true vessel of the serpent.

Qingming and Boya confront the Princess and Shouyue together and learn of their true plan: in order to save Shouyue from dying, he must become the new vessel of the serpent, rendering him immortal. In order to do this, the serpent must be allowed to rise. While the Princess gives birth to the serpent, she remembers her first meeting with Qingming's late master, Zhongxing. Years ago, the two had fallen in love and the Princess had revealed her true identity - the centuries-old immortal vessel of the serpent - to Zhongxing as well as her original name, Fangyue. Knowing that desire would strengthen the serpent within her, Zhongxing left the Imperial City to prevent the Princess's feelings from growing. Before leaving, he created the Spirit Guardian He Shouyue in order to protect her, who later took Zhongxing's form to please the Princess.

The Princess and He Shouyue flee on the now giant serpent, with Boya and Qingming in pursuit. After noticing the chaos created by the serpent, the Princess realizes the error of her ways and attempts to commit suicide with Shouyue but both are swallowed by the serpent. Boya notices that only three of the four stone guardians have awakened, as Shouyue did not awaken the guardian appointed to him to allow the serpent to leave the Imperial City. Shouyue, now the new vessel for the serpent, emerges and fights Boya, Qingming and the Spirit Guardians that Qingming conjures: Snow Hound, Killing Stone and Mad Painter. Boya leaves to wake the last of the four stone guardians, the Crimson Bird. During this process, Boya collapses and becomes a Spirit Guardian himself in the form of the Crimson Bird. While the Crimson Bird and He Shouyue battle each other, Qingming teleports himself inside the serpent where he shows the Princess the last memory he has with Zhongxing. Zhongxing confesses he has always loved the Princess and encourages her to do the right thing. Qingming and the Princess teleport outside, and the Princess, no longer immortal as she is no longer the vessel of the serpent, kills herself with the sword Zhongxing named after her, Fangyue. Distracted by this, He Shouyue is impaled by the Crimson Bird. As the serpent collapses, the Crimson Bird sacrifices himself in order to save Qingming. He Shouyue rises from the serpent's ashes and hurls a sword at Boya's unconscious body, but Qingming throws himself in front of the sword and reaches a moment of clarity where he realizes the true meaning of being a Yin-Yang Master. He successfully deflects the sword from Boya and kills He Shouyue.

Boya awakens, and the two friends say their goodbyes, while the entombed Master Longye is shown to still be alive.

Cast 
 Mark Chao as Master Qingming, the recently appointed Yin-Yang Master whose mother was a rumored Fox Demon. 
 Deng Lun as Master Boya, a friend of Princess Changping's who hates demons.
 Duo Wang as He Shouyue, a Spirit Guardian serving in the Imperial Palace as the High Priest 
 Master Zhongxing, the previous Yin-Yang Master and Qingming's mentor.
 Olivia Wang as Princess Changping, a senior member of the imperial family
 Jessie Li as Master Longye, a master who uses insects and other animals for her magic
 Sun Chenjun as Killing Stone, a demon who becomes a Spirit Guardian for Qingming
 Xu Kaicheng as Mad Painter, a Spirit Guardian for the Yin-Yang Masters, who wields a brush
 Jasper as Snow Hound, an angelic Spirit Guardian of the Yin-Yang Masters
 Lu Zhanxiang as Golden Spirit, a young Spirit Guardian of Master Zhongxing
 Qing Wang as the Hair Demon, a demon who has been waiting for revenge for sixty years

Soundtrack

On December 28, 2020, Deng Lun's closing credits soundtrack titled "Tomb of Infatuation" for this movie "The Yin-Yang Master: Dream of Eternity" hit No.1 on QQ Music, KuGou Music, and DouYin.

On January 5–6, 2021, Deng Lun's closing credits soundtrack titled "Tomb of Infatuation" for this movie "The Yin-Yang Master: Dream of Eternity" hit No.1 on the Asian New Songs Chart. The ‘Asian New Songs Chart’ is a list of new Asian popular/trending music jointly created by Ali Music, Sina Weibo, Sina Entertainment, and Youku Tudou.

Deng Lun's closing credits soundtrack titled "Tomb of Infatuation" for this movie "The Yin-Yang Master: Dream of Eternity" hit No.1 in Migu Music's first half of 2021 film OST ranking chart.

References

External links
 
 
 

2020 films
2020s Mandarin-language films
2020 fantasy films
Chinese fantasy films
Demons in film